Hidhir Hasbiallah is a Singaporean footballer who plays for Woodlands Wellington FC.

Initially starting out as a midfielder, he was groomed to realize his potential as a defender when he was playing for Gombak United.

The 2013 season will be his return to professional football in the S.League after a two-year absence due to his national service conscription. During that time, Hidhir turned out for Police Sports Association in the National Football League.

Hidhir is also a former Singapore Under-21 and Singapore Under-23 international, having most recently received his call up to the 2010 Asian Games football team. 

Hidhir made his debut for Woodlands Wellington on 21 February 2013 in a 2–2 draw against Warriors F.C., coming on as a second-half substitute for Rosman Sulaiman, who was also making his debut for the Rams.

Club Career Statistics

Hidhir Hasbiallah's Profile

All numbers encased in brackets signify substitute appearances.

References

1989 births
Living people
Singaporean footballers
Gombak United FC players
Singapore Premier League players
Association football defenders
Woodlands Wellington FC players
Tanjong Pagar United FC players